Angarogyrus is an extinct genus of fossil beetles in the family Gyrinidae, containing the following species:

 Angarogyrus minimus Ponomarenko, 1977 Cheremkhovskaya Formation, Russia, Early Jurassic (Toarcian)
 Angarogyrus mongolicus Ponomarenko, 1986 Gurvan-Eren Formation, Mongolia, Early Cretaceous (Aptian)

References

Gyrinidae
Fossil taxa described in 1977
Adephaga genera
Prehistoric beetle genera